Nurses (Spanish: Enfermeras) is a Colombian medical drama television series produced by Ana María Pérez that aired on RCN Televisión from 23 October 2019 to 12 August 2022. The series focuses on the lives of several nurses, specifically focusing on the life of María Clara González (Diana Hoyos).

Plot 
María Clara González (Diana Hoyos) works as the head of nurses in one of the most recognized hospitals in the city: the Santa Rosa. Life would seem to smile at her were it not for the monotony into which her marriage with Román has fallen, with whom she has two children. On the day of her anniversary, María Clara makes the decision to win her husband back and reserves a hotel room to spend the night with him. However, Román suffers a heart attack at the scene and is transferred to an emergency to receive medical help. María Clara spends the night at his side. The next day, a woman named Paula arrives, accompanied by her young son, and tells the nurse that it is Román's first-born son. From there, Maria Clara becomes increasingly disillusioned with her husband, to the point of planning their divorce.

On the other hand, a young resident of internal medicine arrives at the hospital, Dr. Carlos Pérez (Sebastián Carvajal), who immediately has a special connection with María Clara, later becoming more than a friend. However, their relationship will be clouded by multiple obstacles, when Maritza and Valeriano, Carlos's wife and father, respectively, find out what happens between them. In addition, María Clara's enmity with boss Gloria, her children's opposition to her new love, the turbulent business that occurs within the hospital on behalf of Manuel Castro (Lucho Velasco), its scientific director, and the appearance of a new person in Dr. Pérez's life will make their lives take different directions.

Cast

Main 
 Diana Hoyos as María Clara González
 Sebastián Carvajal as Carlos Pérez
 Viña Machado as Gloria Mayorga Moreno
 Julián Trujillo as Álvaro Rojas
 Lucho Velasco as Manuel Alberto Castro
 Nina Caicedo as Sol Angie Velásquez
 Federico Rivera as Héctor Rubiano "Coco"
 María Manuela Gómez as Valentina Duarte González
 Cristian Rojas as Camilo Duarte González
 Luciano D'Alessandro as Félix Andrade
 Majida Issa as Alex Luján
 Javier Jattin as Juan Pablo Valderrama

Recurring 
 Andrés Suárez as Agustín Garnica
 Tatiana Ariza as Helena Prieto
 Vince Balanta as Fabio Mosquera
 Andrea Rey as Nelly Mejía
 Alejandra Correa as Inés Chacón
 Viviana Posada as Ivonne Ramírez
 Mariana Gómez as Maritza Ferrari 
 Susana Rojas as Paula Rivera
 Pedro Palacio as Román Duarte
 Nayra Castillo as Psicóloga Esperanza
 Miguel González as Felipe Mackenzie
 Pedro Calvo as Iñaki Ventura
 Juan Fernando Sánchez as Ernesto Álvarez
 Ricardo Vélez as Bernard Mackenzie
 Marcela Posada as Ruby Palacino
 Martha Liliana Ruiz as Jefe Evelyn
 Hugo Gómez as Valeriano Pérez
 María Cecilia Botero as Beatriz Ramírez
 Jessica Mariana Cruz as Mariana Cruz
 Diego Garzón as Luis Tarazona
 Mario Espitia as Jaime Guerra
 Bárbara Perea as Petra
 Andrés Durán as Richi
 Óscar Salazar as Óscar Peñate
 Alexandra Serrano as Milena de Peñate
 Tiberio Cruz as Dr. Castillo

Production 
The series has a format similar to La ley del corazón where in each episode there will be a different case, which will resolve in the same episode. In addition, the series has a team of scriptwriters who are: Patricia Ramírez, Carolina López, Catalina Palomino, Juliana Lema, Rodrigo Holguín, Carolina Becerra, Jorge Ribón, Andrés Guevara, Catalina Coy, Diego Chálela, Johanna Gutiérrez, and as scene directors are: Víctor Cantillo and Luis Sierra. Also is stipulated to have 100 episodes of one hour, it was presented at the 2019 MIPCOM, along with other series such as El man es Germán,

Episodes 

Due to the COVID-19 pandemic in Colombia, RCN Televisión temporarily suspended the telenovela, broadcasting the last episode on 20 March 2020. New episodes resumed on 12 January 2021.

Television ratings 
  

| link2             = #Season 2 (2021–22)
| episodes2         = 242
| start2            = 
| end2              = 
| startrating2      = 7.8
| endrating2        =
| viewers2          = |1}} 
}}

Awards and nominations

References

External links 
 

2019 telenovelas
2019 Colombian television series debuts
2022 Colombian television series endings
RCN Televisión telenovelas
Colombian telenovelas
Spanish-language telenovelas
Television productions suspended due to the COVID-19 pandemic